The Royal Guard of the Hawaii National Guard is an Air National Guard ceremonial unit which is uniformed in a manner similar to the royal bodyguard of the Kingdom of Hawaii of the late 19th century. The original 50-man unit had been disbanded by King Lunalilo after the barrack mutiny of 1873, reestablished by King Kalakaua, and finally abolished after the monarchy fell during the overthrow of the Hawaiian Kingdom at the end of the 19th century.

The current Royal Guards were raised in 1962 as a purely ceremonial unit. Each guardsman is a Hawaiian resident, a member of the Hawaii Air National Guard, of full or partial Hawaiian descent. The unit appears in support of the Governor at official State and other public functions; less frequently, the unit appears at ceremonies involving descendants of former Hawaiian royalty.

In 1963, the Royal Guards consisted of 14 men. It has grown to a strength of 42.

Weapons
 Springfield 45-70 rifles

Ranks
 Kapena Moku (Captain)
 Luna Koa (1st Lieutenant)
 Lutanela (2nd Lieutenant)
 He Kakiana (First Sergeant)
 Kakiana Ekahi (Sergeant 1st Squad)
 Kakiana Elua (Sergeant 2nd Squad)
 Kakiana Ekolu (Sergeant 3rd Squad)
 Kakiana Eha (Sergeant 4th Squad)
 Kaiana Pu (Ordnance Sergeant)
 Kapala Ekahi (Corporal 1st Squad)
 Kopala Elua (Corporal 2nd Squad)
 Kopala Ekolu (Corporal 3rd Squad)
 Kopala Eha (Corporal 4th Squad)
 Kopala Hae (Color Guard Corporal)
 1 Hookani Pahu (Drummer)
 27 Koa (Soldiers)

Uniform
 Navy Blue Jacket
 White pants
 White Pith Helmet
 Black Shoes

External links

Guards of honour
Ceremonial units of the United States military
Hawaii
Military units and formations in Hawaii
Military units and formations established in the 1800s
Military units and formations disestablished in the 1890s
Military units and formations established in 1962
Guards regiments
Bodyguards
Hawaiian Kingdom people
Military of the Hawaiian Kingdom
Governor of Hawaii